Fjell Skole is a school located in Fjell, Drammen, Norway. 77% of the students are from a minority background. The school also runs classes for immigrants to the Drammen area.

In 2008, the school was awarded the Humanistprisen from the Human-Etisk Forbund for "its work in anti-racism, friendship between nationalities, and its mind-changing work". In 2003, it was awarded the Benjamin Prize for its work against racism.

External links 
 Drammen.kommune on Fjell skole

Schools in Norway
Education in Viken (county)
Drammen